Head of the household or Head of household may refer to:

 Head of Household, filer status for the primary income tax filer for a household in the United States
 Head of the household, or Householder, a census term that refers to the head of a family unit or other household
 Hoju (literally "head of the household"), a family register system in North Korea
Kyrios, head of a household in Classical Athens

See also
 Head of household, a role in the Big Brother television franchise
 Head of House, the senior member of a college
 Household deity, a deity or spirit that protects the home or members of the household
 Master of the Household, the chief operational head of Royal households in the United Kingdom
 Pater familias, the oldest living male in the household of a family in ancient Rome
Householder (disambiguation)